Major-General Banastyre Pryce Lloyd (1824 – 21 November 1882) was a British officer, linguist and civil servant.

Biography
Lloyd was the son of Llewelyn Lloyd, younger brother to Edward Lloyd, 1st Baron Mostyn, and of Jane Falkner. He was a cousin of William H. C. Lloyd, Archdeacon of Durban.

He received a commission in the East India Company and participated in several campaigns including the Gwalior Campaign.  In 1846 he was civil commissioner of an Indian district and was there at the time of the Indian Mutiny. After being made a lieutenant-colonel he left India for Natal, South Africa to escape the unhealthy climate.

Lloyd's knowledge of Hindustani made him invaluable to the colonial government who were responsible for a large minority of Indian immigrants. By 1872 he was Protector of Indian Immigrants under Law. In 1874 he was acting Colonial Secretary of Natal and was given a seat on the Natal Legislative Council. He was promoted to the rank of major-general in 1875.

Marriage and children
He married Anna Grimes Stacey.

References

Sources
Burke's Peerage Baronetage & Knightage, 107th edition 
Who's Who: South Africa

1824 births
1882 deaths
British East India Company Army officers
Linguists from the United Kingdom